Diplectrona japonica is a species of caddisfly from the Hydropsychidae family. The scientific name of this species was first published in 1906 by Banks. This species can be found within the Palearctic realm.

References

Trichoptera
Insects described in 1906
Insects of Asia
Taxa named by Nathan Banks